Schönewalde is a town in the Elbe-Elster district, in southwestern Brandenburg, Germany. It is situated 30 km south of Luckenwalde, and 40 km east of Wittenberg.

History
From 1815 to 1944, Schönewalde was part of the Prussian Province of Saxony. From 1944 to 1945, it was part of the Province of Halle-Merseburg.  From 1952 to 1990, it was part of the Bezirk Cottbus of East Germany.

Demography

References

Localities in Elbe-Elster
Fläming Heath